John Dowsley Reid,  (1 January 1859 – 26 August 1929) was a Canadian businessman, physician, and parliamentarian. A Conservative, he was a long-standing Member of Parliament in the House of Commons of Canada for the Ontario Electoral district of Grenville South (named simply Grenville after 1903). He was first elected in the Canadian federal election of 1891 and was re-elected seven more times.

During his years in the House of Commons, he served as a cabinet minister in a variety of posts in the Cabinet of Canada, including:

 Minister of Customs (10 October 1911 – 11 October 1917)
 Minister of Railways and Canals (12 October 1917 – 20 September 1921)
 Minister of Customs and Inland Revenue (Acting) 2 September 1919 – 30 December 1919)
 Minister of Public Works (Acting) (6 August 1919 – 2 September 1919) and (31 December 1919 – 12 July 1920)

On 22 September 1921, he was appointed to the Senate of Canada on the recommendation of Arthur Meighen. He represented the senatorial division of Grenville, Ontario until his death.

References 
 
 

1859 births
1929 deaths
Canadian Ministers of Railways and Canals
Physicians from Ontario
Canadian senators from Ontario
Members of the House of Commons of Canada from Ontario
Members of the King's Privy Council for Canada
Conservative Party of Canada (1867–1942) MPs
Conservative Party of Canada (1867–1942) senators
Unionist Party (Canada) MPs